Emiliano Morbidelli (born 23 August 1977) is an Italian long distance runner and road racing cyclist, competing for the Vatican City. Morbidelli is also the director for Vatican Cycling.

Career
Morbidelli participated at the 2022 Championships of the Small States of Europe in the men's 5000 m competing for the Vatican City, alongside his compatriot Sara Carnicelli, in a "non-scoring" manner. He managed to represent the Vatican as he works as a technician at the Bambino Gesù Hospital which is under jurisdiction of the nation. He finished with a time of 17:28.71, placing sixth unofficially.

References

External links
 

Living people
1977 births
Italian male long-distance runners
Sport in Vatican City
20th-century Italian people
21st-century Italian people